21 Aquilae is a solitary variable star in the equatorial constellation of Aquila. It has the variable star designation V1288 Aql; 21 Aquilae is its Flamsteed designation. This object is visible to the naked eye as a dim, blue-white hued star with a baseline apparent visual magnitude of about 5.1. It is moving closer to the Earth with a heliocentric radial velocity of –5 km/s.

The stellar classification of this star is B8 II-III, with the luminosity class of II-III suggesting that the spectrum displays elements of both a giant star and a bright giant. It is a chemically peculiar star of the Mercury-Manganese type (CP3), although some catalogues consider that status to be doubtful. This is a probable Alpha2 Canum Venaticorum variable that ranges in visual magnitude from 5.06 down to 5.16.

It was first identified as a double star by John Herschel. The companion is a distant background object.

References

External links 
 Image 21 Aquilae
 HR 7287
 CCDM 19137+0218
 V1288 Aquilae

B-type giants
Alpha2 Canum Venaticorum variables
Aquila (constellation)
Durchmusterung objects
Aquilae, 21
179761
094477
7287
Aquilae, V1288
Double stars